Back to the Floor is a corporate reality show in which a senior manager of a company takes on a junior position for a week:

 Back to the Floor (Canadian TV series)
 Back to the Floor (UK TV series)